During the 2000–01 Dutch football season, PSV Eindhoven competed in the Eredivisie.

Season summary
PSV claimed the Eredivisie title for the second year in a row with 83 points in total. The margin to the second-placed Feyenoord was 17 points. In the KNVB Cup, the team lost in the final against Twente. In the Champions League, the team was knocked out in the group stage, finishing third behind Anderlecht and Manchester United. In the UEFA Cup (now known as Europa League), the team was knocked out in the quarter-finals against Kaiserslautern with two 1-0 defeats.

Kit
PSV's kit was manufactured by Nike and sponsored by Philips

First-team squad
Squad at end of season

Eredivisie

External links
EUFO.de

PSV
2000-01
2000-01